is a Japanese anime director, animator, and storyboard artist. Oonuma's first employer in the anime industry was Office AO, but he is best known for his contributions to studios Shaft and Silver Link.

Career
Oonuma's first appearance in anime was as an in-between animator for Berserk) as a sub-contracting employee of Office AO. He continued working with Office AO, and in 2003 made his debut as an episode director on Nurse Me! and Triangle Hearts ~Sweet Songs Forever~ under the series direction of Akiyuki Shinbo. The following year, he was invited alongside Tatsuya Oishi by Shinbo to join Shaft, and the three became known as Team Shinbo. According to Oonuma, Shinbo had invited him to Shaft due to Oonuma's understanding of digital compositing and processing, which he had showcased on Triangle Hearts. Their first project with Shaft was Tsukuyomi: Moon Phase, and Oonuma's liking of the "moe" aesthetic and "gal games" lead to him being particularly helpful to Shinbo on the series, who admitted to having no understanding of the "moe" aesthetics of Tsukuyomi. A majority of Shaft's productions from 2004 to 2009 were subsequently directed by the three, with Shinbo taking an executive role at the studio, and Oonuma and Oishi doing most of the hands-on directorial work. In 2009, Oonuma left Shaft to pursue work with Silver Link. At Silver Link, Oonuma has taken a similar role to Shinbo's executive role at Shaft. He has been involved with most of the studio's productions as either director or chief director, and has mentored or influenced several directors including Masato Jinbo, Masafumi Tamura, Takeshi Inoue, and Mirai Minato.

Style
Since his time with the studio, Oonuma's directing style has been consistently compared to his former Shaft colleagues. ANN reviewer Carl Kimlinger, in his reviews of both seasons of Baka and Test, noted Oonuma's visual cues, which he seemed to take from his time under Akiyuki Shinbo; in comparison to Shinbo's "directorial madman" approach, Kimlinger described Oonuma's direction as being "semi-abstract" and "light"; Nick Creamer, reviewing C3, noted Oonuma's emphasis on "wildly creative" visuals, reminiscent of his previous series; and Theron Martin mentioned the similarities between Dusk Maiden of Amnesia and Ef. Despite the many analyses of Oonuma's style, Creamer later stated, in his review of the first episode of The Ones Within, that a single directorial style could not be attached to Oonuma, and that his visual style was more likely the result of visual experimentation for the sake of visual experimentation than any particular style of choice.

Initially, while he worked on Pani Poni Dash, Oonuma stated that he did not know how to make a comedy using gags since he had never done one until that point but became more interested in it upon viewing Yasuo Ejima's fourth episode of the series. After he saw Tatsuya Oishi's sixth episode of the series, Oonuma decided to take things he believed were interesting and make them his own. Oonuma also started to work closely with the animation staff, with whom he consulted with on how to make certain the storyboards and other parts of the production better , and would ask them to add their own ideas into the work. Although only a key animator at the time, Oonuma specifically consulted with later Shaft director Naoyuki Tatsuwa regarding some of the series' parodies and references as Tatsuwa was knowledgeable on how to implement them, for example. Oonuma developed his sense of style in tandem with the creators around him, as opposed to Oishi's self-indulgence as a director in which he made his own references and parodies away from what he described as the Oonuma team.

The most influential aspect of Shinbo's directing style on Oonuma, according to himself, was Shinbo's taste in colors in his works. Although Shinbo had, at this time, shifted away from using abnormal coloring, Oonuma noted that it was the "power of color" that he had been mostly influenced by while working with Shinbo. Speaking strictly on Oonuma's debut as a solo-director on Ef: A Tale of Memories, Shinbo noted that Oonuma would contrast close-ups of happy faces with long and sad lines from the characters (and vice versa). For Natsu no Arashi!, Shinbo asked Oonuma to come up with a unique way of portraying the hot summer. After talking with the background team, Oonuma decided to use a high-contrast lighting style to emphasize the power of the sun's lighting. The shape of the lighting, however, which appears in certain shapes, was an idea Shinbo had used occasionally in prior instances, which was influenced by art director Yuuji Ikeda's work on Marude Dameo (which Shinbo worked on as an episode director). Oonuma stated that he doesn't give detailed instructions to either the cast or staff of his works, and instead develops the project around a single guideline by which all of the staff can move around and understand. In adapting works to the anime medium, he takes time trying to appeal to the intentions of the original author and the expectations of the viewers, so as to please both the audience and the creator of the work.

Works

Television series
 Highlights roles with series directorial duties.

OVAs
 Highlights roles with series directorial duties.

Films
 Highlights roles with series directorial duties.

Notes

Works cited

References

Further reading
 "Negima!?". (November 2006) Newtype USA. p. 10.

External links

Anime directors
Living people
1976 births